"Born a Woman" is a song by American pop singer Sandy Posey, produced by Chips Moman in Nashville on March 15, 1966.  This reached number 12 on the Billboard Hot 100 in August 1966. It sold over one million copies and was awarded a gold disc.

"Born a Woman" features prominent piano, understated strings and horns, and distinctive multitracked vocals. Posey received two Grammy Award nominations for "Born a Woman" in the categories of vocal performance (female) and contemporary (R&R) solo vocal. "Born a Woman" was covered in Australia in 1966 by Judy Stone, and her version and Posey's reached third and second respectively in the national charts in that country. The song was listed as #23 in Billboard Year-End Hot 100 singles of 1966. Posey's original reached #7 on the Canadian chart and #24 on the UK chart.

The song was later covered by Nick Lowe on his Bowi EP and by Hubble Bubble. The song was later used by Rush Limbaugh for his "Feminist Update".

References

1966 singles
MGM Records singles
1966 songs